Nicholas Switzer House, also known as The Old Stone House and "Switzerland," is a historic home located near Wardensville, Hardy County, West Virginia. The house was built in 1788, and is a two-story I-house with a lower-level and attic constructed of uncoursed fieldstone.  It sits on a stone foundation and has a side-gable, standing seam metal roof.  The rear elevation features a two-story porch built about 1880. The Switzer family were Swiss German immigrants.

It was listed on the National Register of Historic Places in 2008.

References

German-American culture in West Virginia
Houses completed in 1778
Houses in Hardy County, West Virginia
Houses on the National Register of Historic Places in West Virginia
I-houses in West Virginia
National Register of Historic Places in Hardy County, West Virginia
Stone houses in West Virginia
Swiss-American culture in West Virginia
1778 establishments in Virginia